Imbricaria cloveri is a species of sea snail, a marine gastropod mollusk in the family Mitridae, the miters or miter snails.

Description
The length of the shell varies between 13 mm and 35 mm.

Distribution
This marine species occurs off the Philippines, Japan and the Solomon Islands

References

 Poppe G.T. & Tagaro S.P. (2008). Mitridae. pp. 330–417, in: G.T. Poppe (ed.), Philippine marine mollusks, volume 2. Hackenheim: ConchBooks. 848 pp.

External links
 Gastropods.com: Ziba cloveri

Mitridae
Gastropods described in 1971